is a football club based in Toyama, Capital of Toyama Prefecture. The club currently plays in J3 League, Japanese third tier of professional football.

History 
The idea of a merged club had been discussed by the Toyama Prefectural Football Association as early as 2005, but discussions had come to nothing at the time.

On September 10, 2007, YKK (owner of YKK AP SC) and Hokuriku Electric Power Company (owner of ALO's Hokuriku), agreed with merging their clubs to aim promotion to the J.League in response of eager request by the TPFA. According to Tulip TV, local broadcasting company, over 20 companies informally promised to invest in the new club. In the media briefing, the governor of Toyama Prefecture also participated.

TPFA has founded an organization named "Civic Football Club Team of Toyama Prefecture (富山県民サッカークラブチーム)" with two major economic organization and representatives of Hokuriku Electric Power Company and YKK. The Japan Football League confirmed that the merged club would compete in the JFL from the 2008 season.

They applied for J.League Associate Membership in January 2008, then their application was accepted at the board meeting of J.League on February 19, 2008. On November 23 they secured qualification for promotion to the J2 League, and on December 1 promotion was made official by J.League.

In 2014, after a six-year stint at the J2, Kataller Toyama was relegated to the J3 ahead of the 2015 season after a J2 bottom-place finish. The club has since then played at the J3 and will play their ninth consecutive season at Japan's third division.

Name and crest 
The word "kataller" is a portmanteau of the phrase katare (勝たれ) which in Toyama dialect means "to win", and the French aller, "to go". The phrase is also intended to be a pun of Italian cantare, "to sing", and of native Japanese katare (語れ), "to talk" (written with a different kanji character).

The crest is shaped in the form of a tulip, the official Toyama Prefecture flower.

League & cup record 

Key

Current squad 
As of 5 March 2023.

Out on loan

Club officials
For the 2023 season.

Managerial history

Kit and colours

Colours
Kataller Toyama's main colour is blue.

Kit evolution

References

External links 
Official site (in Japanese)

 
Football clubs in Japan
J.League clubs
Sports teams in Toyama Prefecture
2007 establishments in Japan
Japan Football League clubs
Association football clubs established in 2007